Liteboho Mokhesi (born 17 May 1985) is a Mosotho footballer who plays as a goalkeeper. He currently plays Matlama FC. He previously played for the Lesotho national football team, and is still eligible to compete in it.

Youth
Primarily, Liteboho started as a midfielder in the youth setup of Matlama FC. At the tender age of 11, he went to play for FC Likhopo which had just been formed at the time. Even though he was a midfielder, he changed positions to goalkeeper considering the fact that supposing you didn't make the first squad, you were placed in goal. Thereupon, he switched to goalkeeper in those potent circumstances.  In his youth, he was in the Lesotho U-12 national team.

Career
Preceding the move to Bantu FC in the 2011–2012 Lesotho Premier League, the Maseru native also played for domestic teams NUL Rovers and Matlama FC as goalkeeper.

References

External links
 
 

Lesotho international footballers
Lesotho footballers
Association football goalkeepers
Living people
1985 births
People from Maseru
Matlama FC players